Dominique di Prima is a radio personality, producer and activist in Los Angeles. Her work focuses on issues concerning African American communities. Since 2005 she has hosted The Front Page, a morning show on Radio Free 102.3 KJLH. Di Prima was host and producer of the talk show Street Science with Dominique di Prima for almost nine years on 100.3-FM The Beat. Street Science won L.A. Weekly "Best of L.A." award, and a Gracie Award from the American Women in Radio and Television. Prior to her work in radio di Prima worked in television for San Francisco NBC affiliate KRON-TV. Di Prima has won five Emmy Awards, six Parents' Choice Awards, an Ollie and the SAG/AFTRA American Scene Award for positive portrayals of women, the disabled, senior citizens and people of color. In May 2017 di Prima was honored as "Pioneer Woman of the Year" at the Los Angeles City Hall.<ref>{{cite news|title=L.A. Radio Veteran Dominique DiPrima Honored AsPioneer Woman of the Year'|url=https://lasentinel.net/l-a-radio-veteran-and-daughter-of-famed-poet-amiri-baraka-dominique-diprima-honored-as-pioneer-woman-of-the-year.html|accessdate=May 25, 2017|publisher=Los Angeles Sentinel|date=April 4, 2017}}</ref>

Di Prima played Megan McLean in one episode of the television show X-Files''.

Dominique di Prima is the daughter of Amiri Baraka and Diane di Prima, both deceased. She grew up in New York and California. She is married to Guillermo Cespedes, the deputy mayor of Los Angeles. Through her father, di Prima has eight half-siblings, among them Kellie and Lisa Jones, and Ras Baraka, mayor of Newark, New Jersey.

References

Living people
Year of birth missing (living people)
African-American activists
African-American radio personalities
African-American television personalities
American people of Italian descent
Radio personalities from Los Angeles
Television personalities from San Francisco
American women radio journalists
21st-century African-American people
21st-century African-American women